Marie Ejlersen was a Danish film editor active in the 1930s, 1940s, and 1950s. She was the editor on many of directors Alice O'Fredericks and Lau Lauritzen.

Selected filmography 

 Mosekongen (1950)
 Cafe Paradise (1950)
 Den opvakte jomfru (1950)
 Min kone er uskyldig (1950)
 The Red Horses (1950)
 We Want a Child! (1949)
 Hr. Petit (1948)
 The Viking Watch of the Danish Seaman (1948)
 Lise kommer til Byen (1947)
 I Love You Karlsson (1947)
 The Swedenhielm Family (1947)
 Naar Katten er ude (1947)
 I Love Another (1946)
 We Meet at Tove's (1946)
 Red Meadows (1945)
 De kloge og vi gale (1945)
 Panik i familien (1945)
 Affæren Birte (1945)
 Bedstemor går amok (1944)
 Elly Petersen (1944)
 Teatertosset (1944)
 Hans Onsdagsveninde (1943)
 Det brændende Spørgsmaal (1943)
 Tyrannens Fald (1942)
 Frk. Vildkat (1942)
 Derailed (1942)
 Tag til Rønneby Kro (1941)
 Far skal giftes (1941)
 Tror du jeg er født i Gaar! (1941)
 En ganske almindelig pige (1940)
 Pas på Svinget i Solby (1940)
 Familien Olsen (1940)
 I dag begynder livet (1939)
 Nordhavets mænd (1939) 
 De tre måske fire (1939)
 Blaavand melder Storm (1938)
 Livet paa Hegnsgaard (1938) 
 Der var engang en Vicevært (1937)
 Frk. Møllers jubilæum (1937)
 En fuldendt gentleman (1937)

References

External links

1890s births
Women film editors
Danish film editors
Year of death missing